Fallen Leaf is an unincorporated community in El Dorado County, California. It is located at the south end of Fallen Leaf Lake, at an elevation of 6527 feet (1959 m).

A resort called Fallen Leaf Lodge was founded by William W. Price in 1908. A post office opened in 1908.

References

Unincorporated communities in California
Unincorporated communities in El Dorado County, California
Populated places established in 1908
1908 establishments in California